Knema malayana is a species of plant in the family Myristicaceae. It is a tree found in Peninsular Malaysia, Singapore, and Thailand.

References

malayana
Trees of Malaya
Trees of Thailand
Least concern plants
Taxonomy articles created by Polbot